The Sea of Ice is a 19th century melodrama play in English adapted from the 1853 French play La Priére des Naufragés (Prayer of the Wrecked) by Adolphe d'Ennery and Ferdinand Dugué.

French debut
The French play under the title La Priére des Naufragés was first performed at the Théâtre de l'Ambigu-Comique and debuted on 20 October 1853.

Original Paris cast
Carlss by Charles de Chilly
Barabas by Laurent
Raoul de Lascours by Delafosse
Georges De Laval by M. Coste
Horace de Brionne by C. Lemaitre
Medoc by Machanette
Un Secretaire d'Ambassade by Depresle
Un Intendant by Martin
Premier Matelot by Richer
Deuxieme Metelot by Lavergne
Louise de Descours by Marie Laurent
Ogarita by Idem
La Comtesse de Theringe by Mesanges
Diane by Snadre
Marthe, age 6 by De Brueil

English adaptations
In London, it debuted at the Adelphi Theatre under the title The Thirst for Gold, or the Lost Ship and the Wild Flower of Mexico on 4 December 1853, with Benjamin Nottingham Webster as Carlos.  It ran to great success until June 1854, and had a running length of three and a half hours.  The big draw was a scene where the mutineers of a ship strand the captain and his family on a sea of ice which then breaks up.  However, because Webster had simply pirated the play from the French version, once this was exposed a number of copycat translations popped up.  One adaptation appeared at the Marylebone Theatre in London in 1854 under the title The Struggle for Gold: or, the Orphan of the Frozen Sea, which added a Danish vessel breaking up the sea ice to serve as a rescue ship.  Webster revived the play in 1874 under the title Prayer in the Storm where it ran for 143 performances (28 March - 11 September 1874), and featured Geneviève Ward.

Original Adelphi cast
Captain De Lascours - Charles Selby
Carlos - Benjamin Nottingham Webster
Jean Medoc - Paul Bedford
Pieree Pacome - R. Romer
First Sailor - C.J. Smith
Second Sailor - Mrs. Anders
Barabas - Robert Keeley
Louise de Lascours - Madame Céleste
Marie, child - Miss Stroker
Marquis del Monte - Benjamin Nottingham Webster
Horace de Brionne - Mr. Garden
Georges De Laval - Mr. Parselle
Secretary to the Spanish Embassy - Mr. Hastings
The Countess Theringe - Mrs. L. Murray
Mdlle. Diana De Lascours - Miss F. Maskell

American adaptation
Laura Keene produced the play in America to success as The Sea of Ice.  She brought on the play at her New York theatre on 5 November 1857, where it ran until 21 December, and it saved her company financially.  President Abraham Lincoln and his wife attended a Keene performance of the play in Washington, D.C., on 8 February 1864.

Original Keene New York cast (5 November 1857)
Henri De Lascours - Charles Wheatleigh
Louise De Lascours - Laura Keene
Carlos - George Jordan
Medoc - C. Peters
Pasquin - Burke
Marie - Mary Bullock
Horace - G. W. Stoddart
Don Jose - Carlton Howard
Mlle. Diane De Theringe - Charlotte Thompson
Barbaras - Joseph Jefferson
Jano - F. Evans
Georges - T. Duncan
Countess - Mary Wells

References

External links
 Full text of play, English
 La Priére des Naufragés (1853)
 La Priére des Naufragés, Google books (1853)
 Illustration from December 1853 Illustrated London News

1853 plays